Eblis is a genus of bugs in the tribe Mirini.

References

External links 
 

 Eblis at insectoid.info

Miridae genera
Mirini